Conotrachelini is a tribe of true weevils in the family of beetles known as Curculionidae. There are about 7 genera and at least 50 described species in Conotrachelini.

Genera
These seven genera belong to the tribe Conotrachelini:
 Conotrachelus Dejean, 1835 i c g b
 Epacalles Kissinger, 1964 i c g b
 Lepilius Champion, 1905 c g b
 Micralcinus LeConte, 1876 i c g b
 Microhyus LeConte, 1876 i c g b
 Micromastus LeConte, 1876 i c g b
 Pheloconus Roelofs, 1875 i c g b
Data sources: i = ITIS, c = Catalogue of Life, g = GBIF, b = Bugguide.net

References

Further reading

External links

 

Molytinae